Pseudoanthidium orientale is a species of bee in the genus Pseudoanthidium, of the family Megachilidae.

References
 http://animaldiversity.org/accounts/Pseudoanthidium_orientale/classification/
 https://www.itis.gov/servlet/SingleRpt/SingleRpt?search_topic=TSN&search_value=756094
 https://www.gbif.org/species/107589873

Megachilidae
Hymenoptera of Asia
Insects of Sri Lanka
Insects described in 1897